Andrzej Matysiak (born January 23, 1948) is a Polish sprint canoer who competed in the early to mid-1970s. He won two bronze medals at the 1974 ICF Canoe Sprint World Championships in Mexico City, earning them in the K-1 4 x 500 m and K-4 10000 m events.

Matysiak also competed in the K-4 1000 m event at the 1972 Summer Olympics in Munich, but was eliminated in the semifinals.

References

Sports-reference.com profile

1948 births
Canoeists at the 1972 Summer Olympics
Living people
Olympic canoeists of Poland
Polish male canoeists
Sportspeople from Poznań
ICF Canoe Sprint World Championships medalists in kayak